Periamet Mosque is a mosque situated on Vepery High Road in Chennai, India. The mosque is named after the Periamet neighbourhood in which it is located.

History 
The Periamet mosque was constructed in 1838 by hides and skins' dealers, Jamal Moideen Sahib and Roshan NMA Carim Omar and Co. The mosque has been rebuilt twice after India's independence. The structure can accommodate up to 4,000 worshipers.

References 

 

Mosques in Chennai
Rebuilt buildings and structures in India
Religious buildings and structures completed in 1838